Rhadalidae are a family of beetles of the superfamily Cleroidea, formerly treated as a subfamily within the family Melyridae. The adults are predators or feed on pollen, while the larvae are probably carnivorous.

Distribution
Worldwide, except Australasia.

Genera

 Anthriboclerus Schenkling, 1922
 Antinea Peyerimhoff, 1929
 Aplocnemus Stephens, 1830
 Eucymbolus Champion, 1913
 Flavojulistus Majer, 1990
 Gietella Constantin & Menier, 1987
 Hemipleurus Peacock, 1987
 Indiodasytes Pic, 1916
 Jelinekius Majer, 1990
 Kubanius Majer, 1983
 Malthacodes Waterhouse, 1876
 Microcymbolus Pic, 1951
 Microjulistus Reitter, 1889
 Pelecophora Dejean, 1821
 Rhadalus Leconte, 1852
 Semijulistus Schilsky, 1894
 Trichoceble Thomson, 1859

References

Cleroidea
Polyphaga families